Song Yu-jin (born 25 January 1967) is a South Korean gymnast. He competed in seven events at the 1988 Summer Olympics.

References

1967 births
Living people
South Korean male artistic gymnasts
Olympic gymnasts of South Korea
Gymnasts at the 1988 Summer Olympics
Place of birth missing (living people)
20th-century South Korean people